David Torrence may refer to:

David Torrence (actor) (1864–1951), Scottish-American film character actor 
David Torrence (athlete) (1985–2017), Peruvian-American Olympic runner

See also
David Torrance (disambiguation)